Santos Velázquez y Tinoco  (died 1846) was a Costa Rican politician.

Costa Rican politicians
Year of birth missing
1846 deaths